The University of Arts in Belgrade is a public university in Serbia. It was founded in 1957 as the Academy of Arts to unite four academies. It became a university and acquired its current name in 1973.

History

The University of Arts was established on 10 June 1957, as the Academy of Arts, a union of the existing higher art schools (academies). Until then independent, the Academy of Music (founded in 1937), the Academy of Fine Arts (founded in 1937), the Academy of Applied Arts (founded in 1948) and the Academy of Theatrical Arts (founded in 1948) became the Academy of Art, an association of higher art schools in Belgrade.

In 1973, these four academies, being the only higher art schools in Serbia at that time, became faculties: the Faculty of Fine Arts, the Faculty of Music, the Faculty of Applied Arts and Design and the Faculty of Dramatic Arts (theater, film, radio and television). Being their association, the then Academy of Arts became the University of Arts in Belgrade.

Faculties

Faculty of Music Arts
The Faculty of Music is the oldest higher education institution for music in Serbia. It was established in 1937 as the Academy of Music, and became a faculty and acquired its current name in 1973.

Faculty of Fine Arts
The Faculty of Fine Arts is a higher education institution that was established in 1937 by Toma Rosandić, Milo Milunović and Petar Dobrović as the Academy of Fine Arts, and became a faculty and acquired its current name in 1973. The faculty has three departments - sculpture, painting and graphic - and has approximately 2500 students and a teaching staff of 550.

Faculty of Applied Arts
The Faculty of Applied Arts was established in 1948 as the Academy of Applied Arts, and became a faculty and acquired its current name in 1973.

Faculty of Dramatic Arts
The Faculty of Dramatic Arts was established in 1948 as the Academy of Theatre Arts. In 1950, the High Education School for Film Acting and Directing was merged into it, and in 1962, its name was changed to the Academy of Theatre, Film, Radio and Television. In 1973, it became a faculty and acquired its current name.
It is the only one located in Novi Beograd.

Interdisciplinary studies
Interdisciplinary studies of the University of Arts in Belgrade were founded in 2001, as contemporary conceived studies in the domain of polymedia, digital arts, scene design, theory of arts and media and management in the culture. Interdisciplinary studies were created out of the need of studying contemporary artistic or theoretical fields which are not covered by usual artistic and scientific disciplines. These studies research new artistic and theoretical practices, which are linked to studies on particular faculties.

Interdisciplinary studies represent a significant developmental activity of the University of arts which strengthens links of the University with its faculties, improves cooperation amongst professors of the faculties of arts, as well as the experts from various fields

Rectors
List of rectors with term served:
 Sreten Stojanović (1957–1958)
 Mihailo Vukdragović (1958–1959)
 Đorđe Andrejević-Kun (1959–1963)
 Vjekoslav Afrić (1963–1965)
 Bruno Brun (1965–1971)
 Jovan Kratohvil (1971–1973)
 Dragoslav Stojanović Sip (1973–1976)
 Ratko Đurović (1976–1977)
 Radoš Novaković (1977–1979)
 Aleksandar Obradović (1979–1983)
 Vojin Stojić (1983–1985)
 Nandor Glid (1985–1989)
 Darinka Matić-Marović (1989–1998)
 Radmila Bakočević (1998–2000)
 Milena Dragićević-Šešić (2000–2004)
 Čedomir Vasić (2004–2009)
 Ljiljana Mrkić Popović (2009–2015)
 Zoran Erić (2015–2018)
 Mileta Prodanović (2018–2021)
 Mirjana Nikolić (2021–present)

See also
 Education in Serbia
 List of universities in Serbia

References

External links
 

 
Educational institutions established in 1957
Education in Belgrade
Arts
Arts organizations based in Serbia
Arts organizations established in 1957
1957 establishments in Serbia
Savski Venac